The Hughes-Columbia 27 is a Canadian sailboat that was designed by Alan Payne as a cruiser and first built in 1978.

The Hughes-Columbia 27 is a development of the 1976, Payne-designed Columbia 8.3.

Production
The design was built by Hughes Boat Works in Canada, from 1978 until 1980, but it is now out of production.

Design
The Hughes-Columbia 27 is a recreational keelboat, built predominantly of fibreglass, with wood trim. It has a masthead sloop rig, an internally mounted spade-type rudder and a fixed fin keel. It displaces  and carries  of iron ballast.

The boat is fitted with a Japanese Yanmar 2QM diesel engine for docking and manoeuvring.

See also
List of sailing boat types

References

Keelboats
1970s sailboat type designs
Sailing yachts
Sailboat type designs by Alan Payne
Sailboat types built by Hughes Boat Works